was a Japanese author, journalist and media historian born in the Kagawa Prefecture.  His given name was Miyatake Kameshiro (宮武 龜四郎).

The parody replaces the Emperor with a skeleton and is captioned: . The skeleton was a play on words of the name of magazine's publisher Miyatake, whose given name is a homophone of the Japanese word  ("skeleton").

References

Works cited

 
 

1867 births
1955 deaths
Japanese writers
Media historians